John Henry Sharp (April 25, 1874 – November 20, 1957) was a justice of the Supreme Court of Texas from December 1934 to December 31, 1952.

References

Justices of the Texas Supreme Court
1874 births
1957 deaths